Michigan Proposal 1 may refer to:

 2008 Michigan Proposal 1, the Michigan Compassionate Care Initiative

 2015 Michigan Proposal 1, referendum on tax-related statutes and constitutional amendment

 2018 Michigan Proposal 1, marijuana legalization initiative

 2020 Michigan Proposal 1, oil and gas revenue initiative